Ladislav Toman may refer to:
 Ladislav Toman (volleyball)
 Ladislav Toman (sculptor)